Waiting at the Church is a 1906 American silent film directed by Edwin S. Porter for the Edison Manufacturing Company.

The film has been preserved in the Library of Congress collection.

Production and release

The film features a performance of the popular British music hall song Waiting at the Church by Vesta Victoria. Film historian Charles Musser notes that Waiting at the Church was Edison's lowest-selling film of the year, at 52 copies, compared to Dream of a Rarebit Fiend, which sold 192.

The action in the film follows the lyrics of the song. Porter made another film to accompany the song for the Novelty Song Film Co. in 1907. That version focuses more on the singer's performance.

Cast
Vesta Victoria - Vesta
Alec B. Francis - suitor

References

External links

American silent short films
1906 films
Films based on songs
Films directed by Edwin S. Porter
1906 comedy films
1906 short films
Silent American comedy films
American black-and-white films
American comedy short films
1900s American films